Mohamed Adel Hussein (born 25 July 1978) is an Egyptian football referee.

Adel became a FIFA referee in 2018. He has served as a referee at the 2018–19 CAF Champions League.

Adel is police officer and is a member of the Egyptian National Police.

References

1978 births
Egyptian football referees
Living people
Sportspeople from Cairo